This is a list of football games played by the Uzbekistan national football team between 1992 and 1999.

1992

1994

1995

1996

1997

1998

1999

See also
 Uzbekistan national football team
 Uzbekistan national football team results (2000–09)
 Uzbekistan national football team results (2010–19)
 Uzbekistan national football team results – B Matches

External links
Uzbekistan International Matches – Details 1992–1999

1990s in Uzbekistani sport
1992